Los Alcarrizos is a municipality (municipio) of the Santo Domingo province in the Dominican Republic.  Within the municipality there are the following municipal districts (distritos municipales): Palmarejo-Villa Linda and Pantoja.

For comparison with other municipalities and municipal districts see the list of municipalities and municipal districts of the Dominican Republic.

References 

Populated places in Santo Domingo Province
Municipalities of the Dominican Republic